Russell High School is a public high school located in Russell, Kentucky, near Flatwoods.  

The school was built in 1962 in Flatwoods/Kenwood (the area was later annexed by the city of Russell), and is located nearby Russell Middle School (built in 1969). Its school mascot is the Red Devils. Notable alumni include Billy Ray Cyrus (class of 1979).

References

External links 
 

Public high schools in Kentucky
Schools in Greenup County, Kentucky

Educational institutions established in 1962